Rafał Górski (born 22 September 1973 in Krakow – died 4 July 2010 in Krakow) was a Polish historian, writer, anarchist, trade union and housing activist.

Górski was the author of several books and pamphlets on self-governance and cooperation. He was considered one of the most important figures in the contemporary Polish anarchist movement.

Personal Life and Activism 
Górski was born on the 22nd of September, 1973, in Krakow. In 1988 to 1990, Górski was a member of Federation of Fighting Youth (Federacja Młodzieży Walczącej) and the Youth Organization of the Confederation of Independent Poland (Konfederacja Polski Niepodległej or KPN). In mid 1989, Górski became head of the youth organization of KPM, were he remained in the organization till 1991. At age 16, Górski participated in the fights of the 1989 Krakow May, where youth from ZOMO fought against the election campaign of Leszek Moczulski, who ran for a mandate from the list of the Confederation of Independent Poland in the contract elections. In 1989, Górski also took part in the protests in Warsaw against the election of Wojciech Jaruzelski as President of Poland and in Krakow in protests at the Soviet consulate. He later participated in ZSMP's and PZPR's occupation of the consulate in September 1989, and December 1989, respectively, and was involved in a series of street fights in Nowa Huta at the Lenin monument. In 1990, he supported the election campaigns of KPN members to the Krakow City Council, and participated in protests at the Soviet consulate against their aggression towards Lithuania in January 1991. He also took part in the Trail of the First Cadre Company March from Kraków to Kielce.

In 1991, Górski joined Anarchist Federation (Krakow section), the Free Caucasus Committee and the Committee for the Assistance and Defense of Repressed Workers. Within these organizations, he helped co-organize a number of protests, including a blockade against the construction of Czorsztyn Dam), which resulted in a number of arrests.

In 1995, Górski was arrested and jailed for his role in the occupation of the Delegation of the Ministry of Privatization building in Krakow and for previous charges of resisting police during the Dam Tamie in Czorsztyn, in July 1992. Anarchists and members of KPN rallied in his defence, including MP Leszek Moczulski, who issued a surety for Górski. Górski was sentenced to a fine and was released following three weeks of hunger strike while being held in custody.

On February 8, 2022, Górski was arrested on suspicion of attacking a police officer during an eviction blockade earlier in the year. Anarchist organizations criticized the arrest, claiming that his detention was an attempt by police to "silence the citizens". Górski had originally planned a demonstration for the following day. Once news of his arrest reached anarchist circles, anarchists across Poland carried out "Liberate Górski" campaigns, in an effort to draw attention to his "unfounded arrest". Górski was sentenced to eight months in prison, which was later commuted to two years of probation.
Górski later served as a domestic and international delegate to the anarcho-syndicalist trade union, Workers' Initiative. He was a founder of the Environmental Commission in Krakow, in 2008. That same year, he began working in activism for tenets living in Krakow. He founded the "Sprawa Lokatorska" newsletter and participated in eviction blockades.

In 2006, Górski was diagnosed with cancer. In September 2009, Górski was hospitalized following injuries he received in a police raid. While in the hospital his health deteriorated and he underwent two operations due to a relapse in cancer. Rafał Górski died on July 4, 2010 in Krakow at the age of 37.

Journalism 
Górski published in a number of anarchist and workers rights newsletters, including Another World, Mać Pariadka, Przegląd Anarchistyczny, Recycling Ideas, and Workers' Tribune. From 2000-2004, he co-edited the anarchist periodical A-tak. In his writings, Górski wrote predominately on the theory and practicality of Representative Democracies, the history of anarchism and syndicalism in Poland, and on the popularity of cooperatives. In 2007, he published Without the State. Democracy that participates in action, which was described by the publisher as "the answer to the crisis of liberal democracy". This book, divided into three parts, discusses the impacts of representative democracy on local governments, workplaces and the judiciary. In this book, Górski discusses the difference between the theory and practice of democracy, specifically stating in the preface "many myths that have arisen around participatory democracy: that it is a beautiful system, but impossible to implement" In 2008, he published Polish assassins and in 2009, he published the article What if the transport was free?

Works 
 ABC anarchosyndykalizmu. Mielec: Wydawnictwo "Inny Świat", 1999.[wspólnie z Michałem Przyborowskim]
 Demokracja uczestnicząca w samorządzie lokalnym. Poznań: Wydawnictwo Poznańskiej Biblioteki Anarchistycznej, 2003. .
 Przewodnik po demokracji uczestniczącej (partycypacyjnej). Poznań: Kraków : Oficyna Wydawnicza Bractwa "Trojka", 2005. .
 Bez państwa: demokracja uczestnicząca w działaniu. Kraków: Korporacja Ha!art, 2007. .
 Historia i teraźniejszość samorządności pracowniczej w Polsce. Poznań: Oficyna Bractwa "Trojka", [2007]. .
 Polscy zamachowcy. Droga do wolności. Kraków: Egis Libron, 2008. .

See also

 Federacja Anarchistyczna
 Anarchism in Poland

References

1973 births
2010 deaths
Polish anarchists
21st-century Polish historians
Polish male non-fiction writers